Everybody Sing is a 1938 American musical comedy film starring Allan Jones, Judy Garland, and Fanny Brice, and featuring Reginald Owen and Billie Burke.  The film was a significant step in Garland's career.

Plot
Young Judy Bellaire (Judy Garland) has trouble fitting in at school, causing trouble by introducing her jazzy style into music class and being expelled as a result.  Returning home to her dysfunctional and financially challenged family, where her frustrated playwright-father (Reginald Owen),  ditzy actress-mother (Billie Burke), and beautiful elder sister, Sylvia (Lynne Carver) compete for attention along with the funny Russian maid, Olga (Fanny Brice) and the hunky singing cook, Ricky (Allan Jones), who is not-so-secretly in love with Sylvia. Judy foils her father's attempt to ship her off to Europe by escaping from the ship and then trying out for a musical show as a blackface singer, taking advantage of her love of jazz to enchant the show's producer, who hires her and makes her a star of his new show.  Meanwhile, Ricky cuts a record, musically expressing his love for Sylvia.  Nevertheless, Sylvia is forced into engagement with another man.

When the distraught parents discover their younger daughter is appearing in a musical show, Sylvia rejoins her love, who is also appearing in the show.  Finally, all the cast members are reunited, including Olga, who finds her lost love, Boris.  The film's happy ending includes an extravagant stage piece with gorgeously attired chorus girls, happily reunited parents and child, and the happy kiss between Sylvia and Ricky, who is now the producer of a successful musical show.

Cast

Allan Jones as Richard "Ricky" Saboni
Judy Garland as Judy Bellaire
Fanny Brice as Olga Chekaloff
Reginald Owen as Hillary Bellaire
Billie Burke as Diana Bellaire
Reginald Gardiner as Jerrold Hope
Lynne Carver as Sylvia Bellaire
Helen Troy as Hillary's secretary
Monty Woolley as John "Jack" Fleming
Adia Kuznetzoff as Boris, the bus driver
Henry Armetta as Signor Giovanni Vittorino, Cafe Nappo
Michelette Burani as Madame Le Brouchette
Mary Forbes as Miss Colvin

Cast notes
 Everybody Sing is the final film Allan Jones appeared in for MGM, and the first MGM contract film for Monty Woolley.

Music 
In Everybody Sing,  Allan Jones introduces  the pop standard "The One I Love", with lyrics by Gus Kahn and music by Bronisław Kaper and Walter Jurmann.  The film also includes three other songs from the same composing team: "(Down On) Melody Farm," "Swing Mr. Mendelssohn," and "The Show Must Go On". Jones also sings part of Kaper and Jurmann's hit song "Cosi-Cosa", which he introduced in the MGM film A Night at the Opera (1935).  The music and lyrics for "Quainty, Dainty Me" and "Snooks (Why? Because!)" are by Bert Kalmar and Harry Ruby.  The "Snooks" number is based on the character "Baby Snooks" played on Broadway and on the radio by Brice.  The St. Brendan's Boys Choir, directed by Robert Mitchell, provided the singing voices for the schoolgirl chorus that backs Judy on her numbers.

The musical numbers were staged by Dave Gould, except for "Quainty, Dainty Me", which was staged by Seymour Felix; the dance director was Val Raset.  Fanny Brice's dancing was doubled by Iola Cochran.

Production
Working titles for the film were "The Ugly Ducking" – a reference to Garland's character – and "Swing Fever". Principal photography took place from September 2–3, and then late September to December 21, 1937. Retakes took place January 8–10, 1938.

After a stalled career, this was one of the films marking the picking up of momentum in Judy Garland's ascent to stardom. Following the sensational audience reaction to her singing "You Made Me Love You" to a picture of Clark Gable in Broadway Melody of 1938 (1937), she was rushed into shooting two films back to back, Thoroughbreds Don't Cry (1937) and this film, which was held for later release.

According to TCM.com:

As important as the film itself in the development of Garland's career was a seven-week, seven-city promotional tour that started in Miami Beach and included stops in New York and Chicago. With Garland mentor Roger Edens accompanying her on the piano, she stepped alone for the first time onto huge stages to sing in front of adoring crowds and began to establish the audience rapport that would, in time, make her one [of] the world's greatest live entertainers.

Reception
The reviewer for Film Weekly wrote that Garland's singing put the film into the "excellent" class, and that "Anyone who stands up to Miss Brice at her own comedy game is very good indeed."

According to MGM's records the film earned $655,000 in the US and Canada and $348,000 elsewhere, resulting in an overall loss of $174,000.

References

External links

 
 
 
 
 Everybody Sing at the Judy Garland Database

1938 films
1938 musical comedy films
1938 romantic comedy films
American musical comedy films
American romantic comedy films
American romantic musical films
Blackface minstrel shows and films
Films directed by Edwin L. Marin
Metro-Goldwyn-Mayer films
American black-and-white films
Films with screenplays by Florence Ryerson
Films with screenplays by Edgar Allan Woolf
1930s English-language films
1930s American films